Chelveston cum Caldecott is a civil parish forming part of North Northamptonshire. The population of the civil parish at the 2011 census was 566.   Its principal settlements are Caldecott,  Chelveston and Chelston Rise.

References

External links 
Parish Council web-site

Civil parishes in Northamptonshire
North Northamptonshire